Distinto is the seventh studio album (ninth overall) by Argentine latin pop singer Diego Torres, it was released on May 4, 2010, through Universal.

Album information
The album is entirely produced by Rafael Arcaute, who has a background in Latin pop and Soft rock music. Prior to the release of the album, three promotional singles were released exclusively on Apple's iTunes Store.

It was preceded by the title single "Guapa" a song composed by himself alongside Noel Schajris and Luís Cardoso released on February 22, 2010, managed to provide Diego with a number-ten chart entry on the Billboard Top Latin Songs which peaked at number one. The second single was "Mi Corazón Se Fue" released in July 2010. It peaked at number twenty-six on the Latin Pop Songs, the third single was "No Alcanzan Las Flores" released in January 2011.

Chart performance
The album debuted at number 33 on the Billboard Top Latin Albums, on the Latin Pop Albums the album debuted at number 8, becoming his highest debut on the U.S. charts compared to his previous albums. On the Spanish Albums Chart the album debuted at number 34 making it his second entry to the chart.

The album also debuted on the Mexican Albums Chart at number 21 and number 12 on the Mexican Pop Albums Chart.

Track listing

Charts and sales

Charts

Sales and certifications

References

2010 albums
Diego Torres albums
Universal Music Latino albums
Latin Grammy Award for Best Engineered Album